Harlequin with a Guitar is an early 20th century painting by Spanish cubist Juan Gris. Done in oil on panel, the work is in the collection of the Metropolitan Museum of Art.

The Harlequin with his checkered costume was a favorite theme of cubists and Gris himself portrayed him in approximately forty works between 1917 and 1925.

References 

Paintings in the collection of the Metropolitan Museum of Art
1917 paintings
Paintings by Juan Gris
Musical instruments in art